The Royal Andalusian School of Equestrian Art (Spanish: Real Escuela Andaluza del Arte Ecuestre) is an institution dedicated to the preservation of the equestrian arts, in the Spanish tradition, based in Jerez de la Frontera, Spain. It is one of the "Big Four", the most prestigious classical riding academies in the world.

Activities
The school is devoted to conserving the ancestral abilities of the Andalusian horse, maintaining the classical traditions of Spanish baroque horsemanship, preparing horses and riders for international dressage competitions, and providing education in all aspects of horsemanship, coachdriving, blacksmithing, the care and breeding of horses, saddlery, and the manufacture and care of horse harness.  

The Royal Andalusian School is well known for its "dancing stallions" shows for the tourists. The school is adjacent to the historic nineteenth-century  in Jerez.

See also
Other "Big Four" academies:
 Spanish Riding School
 Escola Portuguesa de Arte Equestre
 Cadre Noir

References

External links

 The Royal Andalusian School of Equestrian Art

Education in Andalusia
Province of Cádiz
Equestrian educational establishments
Buildings and structures in Jerez de la Frontera
Dressage schools and teams
Andalusian culture